Charles Bowler Atwood (1849–1895) was an architect who designed several buildings and a large number of secondary structures for the 1893 World's Columbian Exposition in Chicago. He also designed a number of notable buildings in the city of Chicago.

Early life 
Atwood was born in Charlestown, Massachusetts in 1849. He attended the Lawrence Scientific School at Harvard University.

Professional training 
Atwood trained in the office of Ware & Van Brunt in Boston, where he quickly made a name for himself as a skilled draftsman and designer.

Designs 

The buildings Atwood designed for the Columbian Exposition included the Terminal Station and the Fine Arts Building.
The latter building is the only structure built on the grounds of the Columbian Exposition which still stands in its original location. It houses Chicago's Museum of Science and Industry.

Atwood also designed several other buildings in Chicago, as a member of Daniel Burnham's staff. These include the Reliance Building, and the Marshall Field and Company Building.

Selected works
 Holyoke City Hall, Holyoke, Massachusetts, 1871; partial, H. F. Kilburn completed design in 1874
 Marshall Field and Company Building, Chicago, 1891; partially designed
 Palace of Fine Arts, Chicago, 1893; for World's Columbian Exposition
 Reliance Building, Chicago, 1895; finished work of John Root
 Fisher Building, Chicago, 1895
 Ellicott Square Building, Buffalo, New York, 1895

References

Further reading

External links 

1849 births
1896 deaths
Harvard School of Engineering and Applied Sciences alumni
Architects from Boston
Architects from Chicago
19th-century American architects